The Basketball Champions League (BCL) Best Young Player in an annual award of the Basketball Champions League, which is the third-tier level European-wide professional club basketball league, that is given to the player the Basketball Champions League deems its best young player. The award is given by FIBA. The award began with the league's inaugural 2016–17 season.

Only players who are aged 22 and under qualify for the award.

Voting criteria
The Basketball Champions League MVP is chosen by a vote of the fans online, a vote of media journalists and representatives, and a vote of all of the head coaches of all of the teams in each season of the league. The fans, the media, and the league's head coaches each get 1/3 of the vote distribution.

Winners

References

External links
Basketball Champions League (official website)
FIBA (official website)

Basketball Champions League awards and honors